was a Japanese politician who was Prime Minister of Japan from 1947 to 1948. A Christian pacifist, he bears the distinction of having been the first socialist to serve as Prime Minister of Japan. He was a Christian socialist.

Early life
He was born in Tanabe, Wakayama Prefecture on 28 July 1887. He attended Tokyo Imperial University and received a bachelor's degree in law. Raised in the Christian faith, he was strongly influenced by the Christian socialism of Abe Isoo. After graduating, he opened a law office in a rented YMCA dormitory, and worked as an attorney.

Early political career
Katayama became secretary-general of the Social Democratic Party when it was established in 1926. He was elected to Japan's House of Representatives, representing Kanagawa Prefecture, in 1930. Later in 1932, he joined the executive committee of the Socialist Masses Party. He was removed from the party since he did not participate in the session of the House on which Takao Saito was expelled from the House for his antimilitary speech. After World War II, Katayama began to serve as secretary-general of the Japan Socialist Party when it was established in November 1945. Next in September 1946, he became the chairman of the party's executive committee.

Prime Minister and later life

Following the 1947 elections, in which the Socialist Party came in first, Katayama formed a coalition government with the Democratic Party and the National Cooperative Party. Despite leading a short-lived administration, Katayama, during his time in office, saw the enactment of a wide range of progressive social reforms such as the establishment of Japan's first Labour Ministry; an Unemployment Compensation Act; an Unemployment Insurance Act; and the overhaul revision of the Civil Code, whose section on the family institution was completely rewritten to provide, for instance, the eldest son with a greater inheritance share.

The Labour Standards Act of September 1947 introduced maternity leave for a five weekly mandatory post-natal period and prohibited dismissal of women during maternity leave and for thirty days after the end of the leave although not all workers were covered. In addition, the law provided for equal pay for equal work. The Employment Security Law of November 1947 contained authority for the government to operate a system of free public employment exchanges on a broader and more democratic basis than under the former Employment Exchange Law. It also provided for public services to the handicapped in securing employment, and outlawed labor bosses and other undemocratic forms of labor recruitment. The Child Welfare Law of December 1947 extended special protection to abused, abandoned, and neglected children, guaranteed the privacy rights of children born out of wedlock, established health-care programmes for mothers and children, provided for prenatal care, outlawed the employment of minors in dangerous occupations, and abolished the practice of indentured labour. The legislation also laid the institutional foundation for a nationwide system of childcare centres, created standards for foster parentage, and made the state responsible for setting up and supervising orphanages and other juvenile institutions.

The Law for the Elimination of Excessive Economic Concentration (passed in December 1947) provided for the dissolution of any company considered to be monopolistic, while the "law on the expulsion of Zaibatsu-affiliated controls" of January 1948 enforced the resignation of Zaibatsu board members who were related closely to Zaibatsu families, while a measure was taken to ban on holding the concurrent board posts of their affiliated companies. In addition, a government employees law was enacted, the first group of Japanese Supreme Court justices was appointed, local government and the police were reorganised, the Ministries of Home Affairs, Navy, and War were abolished, extensive revisions were made to criminal law, and progress was made on land reform.

At the end of the 1950s, Katayama was also the president of the Japan's Temperance Union. The influence of left-wing socialists, such as Suzuki Mosaburō, forced Katayama to resign early in his term. After his resignation, Katayama became a member of the Democratic Socialist Party and advocated the maintenance of the pacifist constitution, election reform, and formation of a global commonwealth. In 1963, Katayama left politics after he lost his seat in the general elections.

Honors
Grand Cordon of the Order of the Rising Sun (1964)
Grand Cordon of the Order of the Rising Sun with Paulownia Flowers (1978; posthumous)

See also 
 Katayama Cabinet

References

External links

1887 births
1978 deaths
20th-century prime ministers of Japan
People from Tanabe, Wakayama
20th-century Japanese lawyers
Members of the House of Representatives (Japan)
Prime Ministers of Japan
Ministers of Finance of Japan
Japanese Protestants
Members of the House of Representatives (Empire of Japan)
Social Democratic Party (Japan) politicians
Democratic Socialist Party (Japan) politicians
Japanese Christian socialists